Higher Tregarne and Lower Tregarne are two hamlets northwest of Mawnan Smith,  Cornwall, England, United Kingdom.

References

Hamlets in Cornwall